Dennis Ceylan (born 3 March 1989, Høje Tåstrup, Denmark) is a Danish professional boxer. He was born in Høje Taastrup, but grew up in Aarhus and is a member of boxing club BK Aarhus. Ceylan is a former EBU European featherweight champion.

As an amateur he competed at the 2012 Summer Olympics as a bantamweight.

In September 2012, Ceylan turned professional with Sauerland fighting at super featherweight. He currently has a record of 18-2-2 with 8 knockout wins.

EBU title fights

Ceylan vs. Walsh 
In October 2016, he won the EBU featherweight title by defeating, the reigning British featherweight champion, Ryan Walsh by split decision. The scorecards read 115-112, 115-112 and 112-117 in favour of Ceylan.

Ceylan vs. Lowe 
It was then announced that the first defense of his title would be against Isaac Lowe, the reigning Commonwealth champion. The fight was set for March 2017, but was stopped prematurely, after there was an accidental clash of heads in the fourth round, leaving Ceylan unable to continue. The fight was therefore declared a technical draw, and Ceylan retained his title.

Ceylan vs. Warrington 
In his next bout, Ceylan fought Josh Warrington in an IBF featherweight title final eliminator. Ceylan lost via a tenth-round knockout.

Professional boxing record 

| style="text-align:center;" colspan="8"|19 Wins (8 knockouts, 11 decisions), 3 Losses, 2 Draws
|-  style="text-align:center; background:#e3e3e3;"
|  style="border-style:none none solid solid; "|Res.
|  style="border-style:none none solid solid; "|Record
|  style="border-style:none none solid solid; "|Opponent
|  style="border-style:none none solid solid; "|Type
|  style="border-style:none none solid solid; "|Rd., Time
|  style="border-style:none none solid solid; "|Date
|  style="border-style:none none solid solid; "|Location
|  style="border-style:none none solid solid; "|Notes
|- align=center
|Loss||19–3–2
|align=left| Jesus Sanchez
|TKO
|
|
|align=left|
|align=left|
|- align=center
|Win||19–2–2
|align=left| Levan Tsiklauri
|UD
|
|
|align=left|
|align=left|
|- align=center
|Loss||18–2–2
|align=left| Jesus Sanchez
|KO
|
|
|align=left|
|align=left|
|- align=center
|Loss||18–1–2
|align=left| Josh Warrington
|TKO
|
|
|align=left|
|align=left|
|- align=center
|Draw||18–0–2
|align=left| Isaac Lowe
|TD
|
|
|align=left|
|align=left|
|- align=center
|Win||18–0–1
|align=left| Ryan Walsh
|SD
|
|
|align=left|
|align=left|
|- align=center
|Win||17–0–1
|align=left| Walter Estrada
|TKO
|
|
|align=left|
|align=left|
|- align=center
|Win||16–0–1
|align=left| Elvis Guillen
|UD
|
|
|align=left|
|align=left|
|- align=center
|Win||15–0–1
|align=left| Sergio Prado
|UD
|
|
|align=left|
|align=left|
|- align=center
|Win||14–0–1
|align=left| Dmitry Kirillov
|UD
|
|
|align=left|
|align=left|
|- align=center
|Win||13–0–1
|align=left| Cristian Montilla
|TKO
|
|
|align=left|
|align=left|
|- align=center
|Draw||12–0–1
|align=left| Cristian Montilla
|SD
|
|
|align=left|
|align=left|
|- align=center
|Win||12–0
|align=left| Dzmitri Agafonau
|KO
|
|
|align=left|
|align=left|
|- align=center
|Win||11–0
|align=left| Ivan Morote
|UD
|
|
|align=left|
|align=left|
|- align=center
|Win||10–0
|align=left| Daniele Limone
|UD
|
|
|align=left|
|align=left|
|- align=center
|Win||9–0
|align=left| Edgar Torres
|UD
|
|
|align=left|
|align=left|
|- align=center
|Win||8–0
|align=left| Emiliano Salvini
|TKO
|
|
|align=left|
|align=left|
|- align=center
|Win||7–0
|align=left| Tommi Schmidt
|TKO
|
|
|align=left|
|align=left|
|- align=center
|Win||6–0
|align=left| Yordan Vasilev
|UD
|
|
|align=left|
|align=left|
|- align=center
|Win||5–0
|align=left| Nandor Seres
|TKO
|
|
|align=left|
|align=left|
|- align=center
|Win||4–0
|align=left| Marco Scalia
|KO
|
|
|align=left|
|align=left|
|- align=center
|Win||3–0
|align=left| Antonio Rodriguez
|UD
|
|
|align=left|
|align=left|
|- align=center
|Win||2–0
|align=left| Anton Bekish
|UD
|
|
|align=left|
|align=left|
|- align=center
|Win||1–0
|align=left| Artsem Abmiotka
|TKO
|
|
|align=left|
|align=left|

Titles in boxing

!colspan=3 style="background:#C1D8FF;"|Regional titles

External links 
Dennis Ceylan - Profile, News Archive & Current Rankings at Box.Live

References

Living people
Olympic boxers of Denmark
Boxers at the 2012 Summer Olympics
Bantamweight boxers
Danish people of Turkish descent
1989 births
Danish male boxers
Sportspeople from Aarhus
People from Høje-Taastrup Municipality